Kim Daybell (born 11 August 1992) is a British para table tennis player who competes in international level events.

Daybell is a junior doctor at Whittington Hospital in north London and is working to mitigate the COVID-19 pandemic.

References

1992 births
Living people
Sportspeople from Leeds
Paralympic table tennis players of Great Britain
English male table tennis players
Table tennis players at the 2012 Summer Paralympics
Table tennis players at the 2016 Summer Paralympics
Table tennis players at the 2018 Commonwealth Games
Commonwealth Games competitors for England